is a Japanese footballer currently playing as a midfielder for Fujieda MYFC.

Career statistics

Club
.

Notes

References

External links

1997 births
Living people
Association football people from Kanagawa Prefecture
Sanno Institute of Management alumni
Japanese footballers
Association football midfielders
J3 League players
Shonan Bellmare players
Gainare Tottori players